Sir William Codrington, 2nd Baronet (1719–1792) was an English politician who sat in the House of Commons between 1747 and 1792.

Codrington was the eldest son of Sir William Codrington, 1st Baronet of Dodington Park and his wife Elizabeth Bethall and was born on 26 October 1719. He was educated at Westminster School and University College, Oxford. He married Anne Acton of Fulham, Middlesex on 22 February 1736. He succeeded his father in the baronetcy in 1738 and inherited large plantations in the West Indies at Barbuda and Betty's Hope.

Codrington was elected Member of Parliament for Beverley in 1747 and was re-elected in 1755. In 1761 he stood as MP for Tewkesbury, and was re-elected in the elections of 1768, 1774, 1780 1784 and 1790. He is only recorded as speaking in Parliament once which was on the game bill on 29 March 1762.

Codrington died on 11 March 1792 and was succeeded by his son Sir William Codrington, 3rd Baronet. However he disinherited his son, Sir William and bequeathed his estates to his nephew Christopher Bethell-Codrington.

References

Sources
Kidd, Charles & Williamson, David (editors). Debrett's Peerage and Baronetage (1990 edition). New York: St Martin's Press, 1990.

|-

1719 births
1792 deaths
People educated at Westminster School, London
Alumni of University College, Oxford
British MPs 1754–1761
British MPs 1761–1768
British MPs 1768–1774
British MPs 1774–1780
British MPs 1780–1784
British MPs 1784–1790
Members of the Parliament of Great Britain for English constituencies
Baronets in the Baronetage of Great Britain
William
British slave owners